The 2012 Sorta Unofficial New Zealand Film Awards was the first presentation for the Sorta Unofficial NZ Film Awards, a New Zealand film industry award.

Following the demise of the Aotearoa Film and Television Awards and the announcement that the Screen Directors Guild of New Zealand would not hold film awards in 2012, New Zealand film industry figure Ant Timpson and nzherald.co.nz online entertainment editor Hugh Sundae announced the formation of the Sorta Unofficial New Zealand Film Awards, also known as the Moas.

The inaugural awards ceremony took place at the Civic Wintergarden in Auckland on 4 December 2012 and was webcast at the nzherald.co.nz, and broadcast on the Rialto Channel on 16 December 2012.

Nominees and Winners 
Moas were awarded in 26 categories in three groups – feature film, documentary film and short film. The 2012 Moas cover the period of 15 August 2011 to 29 September 2012 for feature films and short films, and 1 August 2011 to 29 September 2012 for documentaries. Nominees were announced on 5 November 2012, with The Orator and Two Little Boys receiving 11 nominations each.

The Orator won eight awards in feature film categories, including Best Film. In the documentary categories, Shihad: Beautiful Machine won two awards, and the short film category was dominated by Honk If You're Horny, winning three of the six award categories.

Feature Film 
Best Film
 The Orator
 How to Meet Girls From a Distance
 Two Little Boys
 Good For Nothing
 The Most Fun You Can Have Dying

Best Self-Funded Film
 The Red House
 Netherwood
 Good For Nothing
 We Feel Fine

Best Director
 Tusi Tamasese – The Orator
 Dean Hewison – How to Meet Girls From a Distance
 Mike Wallis – Good For Nothing
 Robert Sarkies – Two Little Boys

Best Editing
 Annie Collins – Two Little Boys
 Simon Price – The Orator
 Greg Daniels – Good For Nothing

Best Cinematography
 Crighton Bone – The Most Fun You Can Have Dying
 Leon Narbey – The Orator
 Jac Fitzgerald – Two Little Boys

Best Actor
 Fa'afiaula Sagote – The Orator
 Richard Falkner – How to Meet Girls From a Distance
 Bret McKenzie – Two Little Boys
 Matt Whelan – The Most Fun You Can Have Dying

Best Actress
 Tausili Pushparaj – The Orator
 Tandi Wright – Kiwi Flyer
 Inge Rademeyer – Good For Nothing
 Madeleine Sami – Sione's 2: Unfinished Business

Best Supporting Actor
 Will Hall – Netherwood
 John Bach – Rest for the Wicked
 Jonathan Brugh – How to Meet Girls From a Distance

Best Supporting Actress
 Salamasina Mataia – The Orator
 Aidee Walker – How to Meet Girls From a Distance
 Jessica Joy Wood – Sione's 2: Unfinished Business

Best Screenplay
 Tusi Tamasese – The Orator
 Dean Hewison, Richard Falkner and Sam Dickson – How to Meet Girls From a Distance
 Duncan Sarkies and Robert Sarkies – Two Little Boys

Best Visual Effects
 Jon Baxter and Puck Murphy – Two Little Boys
 Steve Cronin and Paul Story – Good For Nothing
 Frank Rueter and Jake Lee – The Devil's Rock

Best Costume Design
 Kirsty Cameron – The Orator
 Tristan McCallum – The Devil's Rock
 Amanda Neale – Two Little Boys

Best Makeup Design
 Davina Lamont, Sean Foot and Richard Taylor – The Devil's Rock
 Linda Wall – Two Little Boys
 Ryk Fortuna – Good For Nothing

Best Production Design
 Bruce Everard – The Most Fun You Can Have Dying
 Jules Cook – Two Little Boys
 Rob Astley, Roger Guise and Pouoa Malae Lialia'i – The Orator

Best Score
 Grayson Gilmour – The Most Fun You Can Have Dying
 Don McGlashan and Dawn Raid – Sione's 2: Unfinished Business
 David Long – The Red House
 Tim Prebble – The Orator

Best Sound
 Tim Prebble, Chris Todd, Richard Flynn, Mike Hedges and Gilbert Lake – The Orator
 Dave Whitehead – Two Little Boys
 Myk Farmer, Steve Finnigan and Chris Burt – Sione's 2: Unfinished Business

Documentary film 
Best Documentary
 Maori Boy Genius
 Pictures of Susan
 How Far is Heaven
 The Last Dogs of Winter
 Shihad: Beautiful Machine

Best Director
 Sam Peacocke – Shihad: Beautiful Machine
 Dan Salmon – Pictures of Susan
 Miriam Smith and Christopher Pryor – How Far is Heaven
 Costa Botes – The Last Dogs of Winter
 Pietra Brettkelly – Maori Boy Genius

Best Cinematography
 Christopher Pryor – How Far is Heaven
 Ben Freedman – Pictures of Susan
 Peter Young – The Last Ocean

Best Editing
 Cushla Dillon – Shihad: Beautiful Machine
 Christopher Pryor and Cushla Dillon – How Far is Heaven
 Jonno Woodford-Robinson and Richard Lord – The Last Ocean
 Richard Lord and Ken Sparks – When a City Falls

Short film 
Best Short
 Honk If You're Horny
 Home
 Lambs
 Whakatiki
 I'm the One

Best Self-Funded Short
 In Safe Hands
 Dr Grordbort Presents: The Deadliest Game
 The Girl With The Clover Tattoo
 Brothers
 Swansong

Best Script
 Joe Lonie – Honk If You're Horny
 Sam Kelly – Lambs
 Paola Morabito – I'm The One

Best Actor
 Andy Anderson – Honk If You're Horny
 Waka Rowlands – Lambs
 Jim Moriarty – Whakatiki

Best Actress
 Mabelle Dennison – Whakatiki
 Maya Stange – I'm The One
 Anapela Polataivao – Night Shift

Best Cinematography
 Bonnie Elliott – I'm the One
 Andrew Stroud – Ellen Is Leaving
 Ari Wegner – Night Shift

External links 
The Sorta Unofficial New Zealand Film Awards

References 

New Zealand film awards
Film Awards
New Zealand
2010s in New Zealand cinema